The Ludwigshafen (Rhein) Mitte station is in the southern part of the centre of the city of Ludwigshafen am Rhein in the German state of Rhineland-Palatinate. It was established in 2003 and is classified by Deutsche Bahn as a category 4 station.

It is located next to the public transport hub of Berliner Platz and has good connections to all parts of the city of Mannheim and to the surrounding area.

The geographical position of Ludwigshafen Hauptbahnhof (central station) on the outskirts of the city made it necessary to build a new station in a central location at the so-called South Pole of the inner city. The station was opened on 14 December 2003 in the wake of the commissioning of the Rhine-Neckar S-Bahn.  The elaborate design of the station was very well accepted by passengers from the beginning. This accelerated the Hauptbahnhof's loss of significance, so that some Regional-Express trains now stop in Ludwigshafen-Mitte, but not at the Hauptbahnhof.

Station 

The station has a side platform (platform track 1) and a central platform (tracks 2 and 3). The platforms for most of their length are covered by a glass roof and the building is full of light. In 2004, the station received the Renault Traffic Design Award, an architecture prize. A fourth track runs through the station on its southern side without access to a platform. This track is primarily used for freight trains passing through the station.

Originally the station was only intended for handling local transport, in particular the S-Bahn, with main line traffic expected to run between Mannheim Hauptbahnhof and Ludwigshafen Hauptbahnhof without stopping. Subsequently, however, plans were changed and the length of the platform was extended, so that Intercity-Express trains could stop at the station.

Just east of the station the line runs over the Konrad Adenauer Bridge to cross the Rhine. This means that the station is somewhat elevated. There is access from the eastern side of the station from the walkway between Berliner Platz and the Walzmühle shopping centre by stairs, escalators and lifts. There is access on the west side of the station via steps at the overpass over Mundenheimer Straße.

Connections

Rhine-Neckar S-Bahn

Regional transport

References

Railway stations in Rhineland-Palatinate
Buildings and structures in Ludwigshafen
Rhine-Neckar S-Bahn stations
Railway stations in Germany opened in 2003